Asociación Deportiva Club de Fútbol Épila is a Spanish football team based in Épila, in the autonomous community of Aragon. Founded in 1947 they currently play in Tercera División – Group 17, holding home matches at Estadio La Huerta, with a capacity of 1,000 seats.

History

Club background
Club Deportivo Épila Frente de Juventudes — (1947–72)
Club Juventud Épila — (1973–90)
Asociación Deportiva Club de Fútbol Épila — (1990–)

Season to season 
As CD Épila FJ

As CJ Épila–AD CF Épila

4 seasons in Tercera División
1 season in Tercera División RFEF

References

External Links 
  
 Futbolme team profile 
 Season History at FRE 

Association football clubs established in 1947
Football clubs in Aragon
1947 establishments in Spain